Lukáš Luňák (born May 3, 1989) is a Czech professional ice hockey player. He played with HC Kladno in the Czech Extraliga during the 2010–11 Czech Extraliga season.

References

External links

1989 births
Czech ice hockey forwards
Rytíři Kladno players
Living people
Sportspeople from Olomouc
HC Stadion Litoměřice players
HC Sparta Praha players
HC Berounští Medvědi players
LHK Jestřábi Prostějov players